John Anthony Devereux (born 30 March 1966) is a Welsh former dual-code rugby football international.

Rugby Union
In 1989 he toured with the British & Irish Lions, and at the time played club rugby union for Bridgend.

Devereux also made an appearance for the British and Irish Lions against a Rest of the World XV in 1986 following the 1986 tour to South Africa being abandoned due to their apartheid regime. This was later given test status by the IRB in 2009.

Rugby League

Club career
He initially played for Widnes in England and the Manly-Warringah Sea Eagles in Australia.

Devereux was as an interchange/substitute in Widnes' 24–18 victory over Salford in the 1990 Lancashire Cup Final during the 1990–91 season at Central Park, Wigan on Saturday 29 September 1990.

Devereux played  in Widnes' 24–0 victory over Leeds in the 1991–92 Regal Trophy Final during the 1991–92 season at Central Park, Wigan on Saturday 11 January 1992.

Late in his career, prior to retirement he played for Bridgend Blue Bulls

International
He achieving representative selection for the Great Britain and Wales national rugby league teams.

Devereux won caps for Wales (RL) while at Widnes, and unattached 1991...2000 10 (12?)-caps + 2-caps (interchange/substitute) 2 (3?)-tries 1-goal 10 (14?)-points.

He was selected to go on the 1992 Great Britain Lions tour of Australia and New Zealand.
Devereux played from the bench in Great Britain's defeat by Australia in the 1992 Rugby League World Cup Final at Wembley.

After retiring from playing he became team manager of Wales.

Personal life
Devereux lives in Bridgend, Wales with his wife and two daughters.

References

External links
Statistics at rugby.widnes.tv
Guinness Premiership profile

Devereux raring to go

1966 births
Living people
Bridgend Blue Bulls players
Bridgend RFC players
British & Irish Lions rugby union players from Wales
Dual-code rugby internationals
Great Britain national rugby league team players
Maesteg RFC players
Manly Warringah Sea Eagles players
People from Pontycymer
Rugby league centres
Rugby league players from Bridgend County Borough
Rugby league wingers
Rugby union players from Bridgend County Borough
Wales international rugby union players
Wales national rugby league team players
Welsh rugby league coaches
Welsh rugby league players
Welsh rugby union players
Widnes Vikings players